Roseto Sharks is an Italian professional basketball club based in Roseto. They play in the second division Serie A2 as of the 2015–16 season.

Sponsorship names
The club has had several denominations through the years due to sponsorship:
 Cover Jeans Roseto (1982–1983)
 Cordivari Roseto (1998–2001)
 Euro Roseto (2001–2004)
 Sedima Roseto (2004–2005)
 BT Roseto (2005–2006)
 Seven 2007 Roseto (2008–2009)
 Mec-Energy Roseto (2011–present)

Notable players

External links
 Official website

Basketball teams in Italy
Basketball teams established in 1946